Abortion in South Africa is legal on request during the first 12 weeks of pregnancy, and under certain conditions afterwards. Abortion is provided free at government hospitals and a tele-medical or 'pills by post' service is provided by Marie Stopes South Africa and Women on Web International Foundation, partnered with Abortion Support South Africa. Abortion was legal only under very limited circumstances until 1 February 1997, when the Choice on Termination of Pregnancy Act (Act 92 of 1996) came into force, providing elective abortion for a variety of cases.

History

The Abortion and Sterilization Act, 1975 (Act No.2 of 1975) legalized abortion under certain circumstances.

Legal position
In South Africa, a woman of any age can get an abortion on request with no reasons given if she is less than 12 weeks pregnant. If she is between 13 and 20 weeks pregnant, she can get the abortion if (a) her own physical or mental health is at stake, (b) the baby will have severe mental or physical abnormalities, (c) she is pregnant because of incest, (d) she is pregnant because of rape, or (e) she is of the personal opinion that her economic or social situation is sufficient reason for the termination of pregnancy.  If she is more than 20 weeks pregnant, she can get the abortion only if her or the fetus' life is in danger or there are likely to be serious birth defects.

A woman under the age of 18 will be advised to consult her parents, but she can decide not to inform or consult them if she so chooses.  A woman who is married or in a life-partner relationship will be advised to consult her partner, but she can decide not to inform or consult him/her. An exception is that if the woman is severely mentally ill or has been unconscious for a long time, where consent of a life-partner, parent or legal guardian is required.

The Constitution does not explicitly mention abortion, but two sections of the Bill of Rights mention reproductive rights. Section 12(2)(a) states that, "Everyone has the right to bodily and psychological integrity, which includes the right ... to make decisions concerning reproduction," while section 27(1)(a) states "Everyone has the right to have access to ... health care services, including reproductive health care." In the case of Christian Lawyers Association v Minister of Health an anti-abortion organisation challenged the validity of the Choice on Termination of Pregnancy Act on the basis that it violated the right to life in section 11 of the Bill of Rights; the Transvaal Provincial Division of the High Court dismissed their argument, ruling that constitutional rights only apply to born people and not to fetuses.

In general, only medical doctors may perform abortions.  Nurses who have received special training may also perform abortions up to the 12th week of pregnancy. A medicine-induced abortion can be performed by any medical doctor at his/her premises up to 7 weeks from the first day of the last menstrual period.  The usual method is a dose of an antiprogestin, followed by a dose of a prostaglandin analogue two days later.

Health workers are under no obligation to perform or take active part in an abortion if they do not wish to; however, they are obligated by law to assist if it is required to save the life of the patient, even if the emergency is related to an abortion. A health worker who is approached by a woman for an abortion may decline if they choose to do so, but are obligated by law to inform the woman of her rights and refer her to another health worker or facility where she can get the abortion.

Abortion can be had for free at certain state hospitals or even private clinics, although sometimes only if the woman is referred by a health worker. Most abortion centres will insist on providing pre- and post-abortion counselling, and the woman can legally demand it, but it is not a legal requirement that abortion centres provide it.

Statistics 

Since the legalisation of elective abortion care, there has been a decrease in deaths from clandestine abortions (those provided outside of designated facilities), but the number of deaths following abortions are still quite high according to statistics gathered in Gauteng province—5% of maternal deaths following childbirth are abortion related, and 57% of these are related to illegal abortions.

A 2003 study in Soweto showed the following: the rate of abortions for women older than 20 years decreased from 15.2% in 1999 to 13.2% in 2001, the rate for women aged 16–20 decreased from 21% to 14.9%, and the rate for women aged 13–16 decreased from 28% to 23%.  In 2001, 27% of abortions were second-trimester.

See also
 Abortion by country
 Abortion debate
 Abortion law
 Law of persons in South Africa
 Religion and abortion
 Choice on Termination of Pregnancy Act, 1996
 History of Abortion Law Debate
 Birth control in Africa

References

Further reading
 Susanne M. Klausen: Abortion under Apartheid. Oxford, Oxford University Press, 2015. 

 
Health law in South Africa